John Paul McBride (born 28 November 1978 in Hamilton) is a Scottish former footballer.

Career
A childhood friend of future Rangers captain Barry Ferguson, McBride started his career as a youth player with Celtic after leaving Holy Cross High School. He was with Celtic's reserve team for three years before St Johnstone signed him for £200,000 in 1999. He made his debut on 31 July 1999 against Hearts. McBride scored his first professional goal on 18 December 1999 in St Johnstone's game against Kilmarnock.

After suffering injury problems, he joined Danish club Aarhus Fremad on a non-contract basis before joining up with Derry City in Northern Ireland in 2003. McBride was with Derry City for only three months before returning to Scotland and signing for Partick Thistle in the summer transfer window. McBride made his debut for the Jags against Livingston on 9 August 2003. He scored twice for Partick; once in a 1-0 league win over Motherwell and the other in a Scottish Cup tie against Hamilton Academical. He was released after a single season with Partick after not doing enough to secure a new deal.

McBride signed with Stenhousemuir after being released by Partick Thistle. He made his debut with Stenhousemuir under manager Des McKeown in the Scottish League Challenge Cup against Queen's Park, and remained with the club for three years, scoring 19 goals. McKeown formed the opinion that McBride could have performed at the highest levels of football had he shown the required application and attitude to match his talent, but acknowledged that he had to cope with various issues in his personal life.

McBride left Stenhousemuir in May 2007 to join Stirling Albion. He was released by the Binos at the end of the 2007–08 season.

After a period without a club, McBride joined Junior side Wishaw on a one-year deal in 2010 after playing at Amateur level with Low Waters Miners Welfare.

Later years
In summer 2014, he was appointed as assistant to new manager Alan Frame at Thorniewood United. A few months later he was convicted for possession of cocaine.

References

External links

1978 births
Living people
Scottish footballers
Association football midfielders
Celtic F.C. players
St Johnstone F.C. players
Aarhus Gymnastikforening players
Derry City F.C. players
Partick Thistle F.C. players
Stenhousemuir F.C. players
Stirling Albion F.C. players
Wishaw Juniors F.C. players
Scottish Junior Football Association players
People educated at Holy Cross High School, Hamilton
League of Ireland players
Scottish Premier League players
Scottish Football League players
Footballers from Hamilton, South Lanarkshire
Scotland under-21 international footballers
Scottish expatriate footballers
Expatriate men's footballers in Denmark
British expatriates in Denmark
Expatriate association footballers in the Republic of Ireland